Brenda Schultz was the defending champion but did not compete at the DFS Classic in 1993.

Lori McNeil won in the final, 6–4, 2–6, 6–3, against Zina Garrison-Jackson.

Seeds
The top eight seeds receive a bye into the second round.

  Martina Navratilova (third round)
  Amanda Coetzer (third round)
  Nathalie Tauziat (quarterfinals)
  Zina Garrison-Jackson (final)
  Lori McNeil (Champion)
  Patty Fendick (second round)
  Pam Shriver (quarterfinals)
  Larisa Neiland (semifinals)
  Mana Endo (third round)
  Linda Harvey-Wild (first round)
  Ginger Helgeson (first round)
  Rosalyn Nideffer (second round)
  Kimberly Po (second round)
  Elna Reinach (third round)
  Chanda Rubin (semifinals)
  Manon Bollegraf (first round)

Qualifying

Draw

Finals

Top half

Section 1

Section 2

Bottom half

Section 3

Section 4

References
 1993 DFS Classic Draws
 ITF Tournament Page
 ITF singles results page

DFS Classic - Singles
Singles